Michael Rutzen (born 11 October 1970) is a South African conservationist, film maker, and cage diving operator.

Since the beginning of his career as a conservationist, Rutzen has provided field support to the Department of the Environmental Affairs of South Africa when they require his shark expertise. Some projects include deployment of satellite and acoustic tags on white sharks.He is also a member of the Whale Disentanglement Network for the Department of Environmental Affairs. Since 2009, he has acted as field supervisor for population dynamics studies and DNA sampling programs being undertaken for the PhD study of Dr. Sara Andreotti (Stellenbosch University), which he also sponsored and co authored a number of white shark behavioural papers.

He is one of the inventors of the eco-friendly Shark Safe Barrier, which prevents negative encounters between sharks and people. He is currently preparing the barrier for final testing and deployment for the protection of both sharks and man.

Early life
Rutzen was born in Johannesburg, South Africa, the youngest of 5 children. He is the son of Richard Harvey Rutzen, an Evangelist in the New Apostolic Church, of Austrian descent and Marie Rutzen (née Stydom),of Afrikaans descent. He has two older sisters and two older brothers, one of whom is 20 years older than Mike. Due to lung complications from his premature birth, Rutzen’s father moved the family from the city to the small farming town of Brits in The Northern Transvaal when Mike was aged 5 so he and his older brother could benefit from the fresh country air.  As the youngest in his family by many years, Mike spent a lot of his childhood alone, exploring the natural bush and the granite hills of the region surrounding the farm. There he learned important skills in bush survival and the understanding of animal behaviour, in particular of snakes, baboons and leopards.  By the age of 7 he started going to sea on his aunt’s boat, in Tugela River Mouth where he learned to fish and developed a deep love for the ocean.

Career

1993–2013: Career beginnings and breakthrough 
After high school Rutzen enlisted in the South African Defence Force (SADF) as a medic in the 115 Battalion. He spent two years in the bush where he further honed his survival skills.  At the age of 20 he visited the quaint fishing village of Gansbaai in the Western Cape, he liked it so much that he decided to stay and make a life there as a commercial fisherman. In 1993 the shark cage diving industry was established in Gansbaai and Mike was the second local skipper to be employed for his specialised seafaring expertise in the region. He spent a lot of time interacting with Great White Sharks from the boat and observing their behaviour during this time.

Rutzen developed a huge appreciation for these majestic, apex predators. He decided he would like to learn more about the species, so in 1998 he began free diving with the sharks. In 2000 he established his own highly successful shark cage diving company, Shark Diving Unlimited.

While in the water with the sharks Rutzen was extremely cautious and used his knowledge of animal behaviour to understand the shark’s movements and to interact with them. From this expertise he was able to communicate with the sharks by making his body smaller or larger to attract or deter the animal.

2005–Present: International success 
Rutzen’s underwater shark interactions attracted the attention of the media and his first documentary, National Geographic’s Beyond Fear was released in (2005) which described shark behaviour and body language and showed Rutzen free diving with Great Whites without a cage. The film was shown internationally on National Geographic Channel and was viewed by more than 300 million people.

This documentary was soon followed 2006 by "Sharks Man-Eaters or Misunderstood? A John McIntyre Production in association with PADI, Sport Diver and Shark Diving Unlimited to educate workers at Blue Planet Aquarium.

As he observed the sharks further, Rutzen noted that they "were not the mindless killing machines out to hunt us" as portrayed in horror films.  He decided to pursue more knowledge of these predators and contacted the world’s leading shark experts.

In 2007 Rutzen’s Discovery documentary "Sharkman" went to air. Rutzen had developed the storyline by visiting the world’s best shark experts in their fields and learning their expertise from them. He learned one form of tonic immobility from Dr. Samuel Gruber and another form from Christina Zenato, a behaviour which would lead him to the initial idea for the Sharksafe Barrier later on.

Sharkman was a huge hit and became the Discovery Channel’s Shark Week staple for over ten years. In 2009, Rutzen was featured as the "Sharkman" on 60 Minutes with Anderson Cooper on CBS. Rutzen then joined with BBC Natural world to develop The Great White Shark, A Living Legend from 2008-2009 in which Rutzen visited a popular seal hunting area to better understand White Sharks and then 2010: Shark Night on (Discovery French TV)

Rutzen was featured as a shark expert in the IMAX 3D film, Great White Shark 3D (2010) which was filmed in his hometown of Gansbaai and used stunning underwater and aerial footage. The film was screened in IMAX theatres internationally.

Later that year Rutzen acted as stunt double and shark behaviour expert for Halle Berry’s character in the 2010 Warner Brothers film Dark Tide which was filmed in Gansbaai and based loosely on Rutzen’s life experiences.

2010 also saw Rutzen featured as the ‘Sharkmaster' on Stan Lee’s Superhumans https://www.youtube.com/watch?v=uLVw_BduscM which investigated and proved his claims that he could indeed interact and communicate with Great White sharks using body language.  2013 saw him featured in Linge De Fronte (French TV) "Alerte aux requin"

Present 
Since 2009, Rutzen has continued his conservation work by providing field support to the Department of Environmental Affairs of South Africa (deployment of satellite or acoustic tags on white sharks and the diver for the acoustic tagging programme) and other research projects that require his expertise. He is also a member of the South African Whale Disentanglement Network of South Africa, a group of marine experts who assist whales in distress.

Rutzen has also acted as field supervisor for white shark population dynamics studies and DNA sampling programs undertaken for the University of Stellenbosch for the PhD study of Dr. Sara Andreotti, which he also sponsored. He and Andreotti spent up to four years collecting, photographing and sampling shark genetic data in the most extensive field research project ever conducted on White Shark DNA around the South African coastline.

The study identified that South African white shark's long-term survival is under jeopardy with an extremely low genetic diversity. 89% of South African White Sharks share a common mitochondrial lineage and have low mitochondrial diversity relative to some white shark populations. This could jeopardise the future survival of the species, and lead to possible extinction.

The study also concluded that the South African white shark belong to one population, with the same sharks sampled in the east coast (Algoa Bay) also being identified in the South West Coast (False Bay) an implication that is very important in terms of population management.

As part of this research he co-authored a number of white shark scientific behavioural papers.

Rutzen is one of the inventors of the Shark Safe Barrier, which prevents negative encounters between sharks and people. The barrier was conceived in 2011 when Rutzen met Dr. Craig O’Connell, a marine biologist. Rutzen had noticed that sharks did not swim through the local kelp forests, even when pursuing cape fur seals. This inspired the idea for a visual barrier resembling kelp to have the potential to become the first eco-friendly alternative to the shark nets. O'Connell was working on his PhD project exploring the use of electrosensory stimuli, such as permanent magnets to repel sharks, with much success. The two joined forces and combined their knowledge.

The Sharksafe Barrier is made of four rows of large vertical pipes fitted with magnets that move with the ocean currents and tides to manipulate the swim patterns of sharks.  These magnets overstimulate the unique electrosensory system of Elasmobranchs (i.e. sharks, skates, and rays), known as the Ampullae of Lorenzini which detect the electromagnetic fields.  These are associated with prey and may also be capable of detecting geomagnetic fields (0.25-0.65 Gauss) to orientate the sharks during long migrations.  This makes the Sharksafe Barrier shark-specific so other marine animals can swim through it without issue.

The Sharksafe Barrier is currently undergoing final scientific and engineering testing ahead of its first beach deployment.

In the media
Rutzen's performances in a number of documentaries prompted the media to call him "The Sharkman" first stated by Anderson Cooper in his appearance on 60 Minutes America Stan Lee of Superhuman’s Fame called him the "Sharkmaster" for his ability to swim with Great White Sharks without a cage and understand their body language.  On 13 May 2017, he was part of the team, that broke the Guinness World Records, title for the 'Longest Underwater Live Radio Broadcast' in the Atlantis Ambassador Lagoon aquarium.

Personal life 
Rutzen currently lives in Gansbaai, South Africa and Tofino Beach in Mozambique with his two Mozambican beach dogs, wife and daughter.

Achievements 
Rutzen won a Lifetime achievement award at the Tourfilm Festival Prague (2012) for his contribution to extending human boundaries with respect to the world's oceans and in particular for his pioneering work with sharks. The festival organisers stated "It is our humble opinion that your work is reducing man's innate fear of the marine environment". He was also awarded Princeton Global Network Registry Member of the Year (2012), was awarded the Mare Nordest – Adriatico! Un mare d’idee e non solo, Trieste (2012) and the Mayoral's Award for Conservation - Overstrand District South Africa (2015).

Scientific work 
Rutzen has co authored a number of scientific papers on the Great White shark and supervises field research for the scientific work of Dr. Sara Andreotti.

Public speaking
Rutzen regularly delivers marine conservation and scientific talks to promote the preservation of the Great White Shark internationally.  He often shares his views on responsible shark management, conservation and the threats to the ocean, as well as the findings of his scientific field research on the great white shark.

References

External links
 Shark Travel and Conservation Mike Rutzen
 Mike Rutzen's Shark Cage Diving Company
 Sharkman Animal Planet
 
 CNN's Anderson Cooper with Mike Rutzen on Anderson Cooper 360
 The Sharkman meets Michael Rutzen
 Save Jaws! An interview with Mike Rutzen in TUNZA, the United Nations Environment Programme's magazine for youth

South African conservationists
Living people
1970 births